was a town located in Ōkawa District, Kagawa Prefecture, Japan.

On April 1, 2002, Ōkawa, along with the towns of Nagao, Sangawa, Shido and Tsuda (all from Ōkawa District), was merged to create the city of Sanuki.

References

Dissolved municipalities of Kagawa Prefecture
Sanuki, Kagawa